Neil Edward Hopkins (born May 13, 1977) is an American television and film actor. He is a trained actor and singer, best known for his portrayal of Charlie's heroin-addicted brother Liam on Lost.

Early life

Hopkins was born in Trenton, New Jersey. Later, he and his family moved to Aurora, Colorado, where he graduated from Regis Jesuit High School in 1995. He then attended College of the Holy Cross in Worcester, Massachusetts, from 1996 to 1999. He is a graduate of the American Conservatory Theater's MFA program.

Career
Hopkins has portrayed characters in several television shows including a "Specialist" in Birds of Prey, "Lester" in Crossing Jordan, and has had appearances in Dragnet, Charmed, Navy NCIS: Naval Criminal Investigative Service, My Name Is Earl, Point Pleasant and Ghost Whisperer. Hopkins has also starred in an episode of CSI: Crime Scene Investigation as "Donny Drummer" and had a recurring role on Lost as Charlie's older brother and former heroin addict Liam Pace. He also made appearances in two episodes of Big Love as "Ken Byington" and in an episode of The 4400 as "Nick Crowley".  Hopkins plays musicians in several series, appearing as a rock star in The 4400 and Lost, and as a promising musician on Ghost Whisperer.

As well as his television appearances, Hopkins has also had roles in feature films, such as main character Chris in Philip Zlotorynski's Walkentalk, and a guest role in My Big Fat Independent Movie, as the "Lanky Man". In both films, Hopkins did an impersonation of Christopher Walken, a skill he is known for.

Hopkins has also appeared in Aimée Price as "Kevin" and in the 2005 remake of the silent film The Cabinet of Dr. Caligari as "Alan". He also starred in the film Because I Said So as "Rafferty", which was released in 2007.

He co-wrote, co-produced and co-starred in the pilot Hit Factor, which took the Best Drama award at the New York Television Festival (NYTVF) in New York City. Hopkins also starred in the Brothers Strause science fiction thriller Skyline.

Film and television 
 Birds of Prey, 2002
 Crossing Jordan, 2003
 Walkentalk, 2003
 Dragnet, 2003
 Charmed, 2004
 Navy NCIS: Naval Criminal Investigative Service, 2004
 Point Pleasant, 2004
 Lost, 2004–2010
 My Big Fat Independent Movie, 2005
 CSI: Crime Scene Investigation, 2005
 Aimée Price, 2005
 The Cabinet of Dr. Caligari, 2005
 Shark, 2006
 The Net 2.0, 2006
 Big Love, 2006
 The 4400, 2006
 Ghost Whisperer, 2006
 Shadowbox, 2007
 Dirty Sexy Money, 2007
 The Sarah Connor Chronicles, 2008
 Criminal Minds, 2008
 Nip/Tuck, 2009
 My Name Is Earl, 2009
 Skyline, 2010
 Losing Control, 2011
 Femme Fatales, 2011
 True Blood, 2011
 Grimm, 2012
 Leverage, 2012
 Bones, 2012
 Detour, 2013
 Matador, 2014
 Stargirl, 2020

References

External links 
 

1977 births
American male film actors
American male television actors
American Conservatory Theater alumni
Living people
Actors from Trenton, New Jersey
Male actors from New Jersey
College of the Holy Cross alumni
People from Aurora, Colorado
Male actors from Colorado
21st-century American male actors